Sahibzada Muhammad Nazir Sultan (12 February 1944 – 5 December 2022) was a Pakistani politician who had been a member of the National Assembly of Pakistan, between 1970 and May 2018.

Early life
Sultan was born on 12 February 1944.

Political career
Sultan was elected to the National Assembly of Pakistan as a candidate of Jamiat Ulema-e-Pakistan from Constituency NA-48 (Jhang-III) in 1970 Pakistani general election.

Sultan was re-elected to the National Assembly from Constituency NA-67 (Jhang) as a candidate of Pakistan Peoples Party (PPP) in 1977 Pakistani general election.

Sultan was re-elected to the National Assembly from Constituency NA-70 (Jhang-V) as a candidate of PPP in 1988 Pakistani general election. He received 61,550 votes and defeated a candidate of Islami Jamhoori Ittehad (IJI).

Sultan was re-elected to the National Assembly from Constituency NA-70 (Jhang-V) as a candidate of Pakistan Democratic Alliance (PDA) in 1990 Pakistani general election. He received 58,892 votes and defeated a candidate of IJI.

Sultan was re-elected to the National Assembly from Constituency NA-70 (Jhang-V) as a candidate of PPP in 1993 Pakistani general election. He received 63,516 votes and defeated a candidate of Pakistan Muslim League (N) (PML-N).

Sultan ran for the seat of National Assembly from Constituency NA-70 (Jhang-V) as a candidate of PPP in 1997 Pakistani general election, but was unsuccessful. He received 33,483 votes and lost the seat to a candidate of PML-N.

Sultan ran for the seat of the National Assembly as candidate of National Alliance from Constituency NA-90 (Jhang-V) in 2002 Pakistani general election, but was unsuccessful. He received 56,180 votes and lost the seat to an independent candidate, Saima Akhtar Bharwana.

Sultan ran for the seat of the National Assembly from Constituency NA-90 (Jhang-V) as a candidate of Pakistan Muslim League (Q) in 2008 Pakistani general election, but was unsuccessful. He received 58,099 votes and lost the seat to Saima Akhtar Bharwana.

Sultan was re-elected to the National Assembly as an independent candidate from Constituency NA-90 (Jhang-II) in 2013 Pakistani general election. He received 52,476 votes and defeated Saima Akhtar Bharwana. He joined PML-N in May 2013.

As of September 2017, he was the last serving member of the National Assembly who was first elected in 1970 general election.

In May 2018, he quit PML-N and joined Pakistan Tehreek-e-Insaf (PTI).

Death
Sultan died on 5 December 2022, at the age of 78.

References

1944 births
2022 deaths
Pakistani MNAs 1972–1977
Pakistani MNAs 1977
Pakistani MNAs 1988–1990
Pakistani MNAs 1990–1993
Pakistani MNAs 1993–1996
Pakistani MNAs 2013–2018
Pakistan People's Party MNAs
Pakistan Muslim League (N) MNAs
People from Jhang District